Czech Tourist Club (KČT), known also as Czech Hiking Club was created in 1888. With over  40,000 members, it is a large organisation responsible for maintaining the dense Czech Hiking Markers System.

References

Hiking governing bodies
Outdoor recreation
Signage
Trails
Tourism in the Czech Republic
Clubs and societies in the Czech Republic